Emma Montgomery McRae (February 12, 1848 – September 21, 1919) was a Professor of English literature.

Born Mary Emma Montgomery in Loveland, Ohio, she was the daughter of William Montgomery and Anna née Newton. Her family moved to Indiana when she was five. Emma completed her undergraduate work at Brookfield Academy, Indiana, then she taught at a school in Vevay, Indiana.

She became a high school principal in 1867 at Muncie, Indiana and was married to Hamilton S. McRae on August 6, 1868, the local superintendent of public schools. She took the position of principal at Marion, Indiana in 1883. Emma was the first woman in Indiana to be chosen president of the State Teachers Association. Her husband died in 1887, leaving her with two daughters – Bertha born 1873 and Charlene born 1876.

In 1887, she was appointed professor at Purdue University by President James H. Smart. There, she served as the unofficial dean of women and acquired the nickname "Mother" from the undergraduates. In 1894 a group of women created the Muncie McRae club in her honor, which was intended to fill a void caused by lack of educational opportunity for women. She continued her studies at Wooster College, Ohio, earning a master's degree in 1896. In 1913, she was offered the official position of dean of women for Purdue University, which she accepted. She retired June, 1913, whereupon she was granted a retirement allowance by the Carnegie Foundation in July of the same year.

References

External links

1848 births
1919 deaths
Purdue University faculty
Schoolteachers from Indiana
College of Wooster alumni
People from Loveland, Ohio
American women academics